Mohamed Al Makahasi or Makahasi (Arabic: محمد مكعازي; born 5 February 1995) is a Moroccan professional footballer who plays as a midfielder for Raja CA.

References

Living people
1995 births
Moroccan footballers
Association football midfielders
Moghreb Tétouan players
Raja CA players
2020 African Nations Championship players
Morocco A' international footballers